University Technical College Lancashire (or UTC Lancashire) was a university technical college (UTC) that opened in Burnley, Lancashire, England in August 2013. It was located on Trafalgar Street in Burnley, in the historic Victoria Mill which was extensively redeveloped and converted for use by the UTC. The college closed in August 2017.

Sponsors
University of Central Lancashire was the university sponsor of UTC Lancashire, while the National Skills Academy for Nuclear, North West Aerospace Alliance and the Chartered Institute of Logistics and Transport were the strategic sponsors of the UTC.

Employer sponsors of UTC Lancashire included Chubb Systems, Cobham plc, Electricity North West, Enterprise plc, National Grid plc, Rolls-Royce plc, Safran Aircelle and Unison Industries.

Admissions
UTC Lancashire had an initial intake of students aged 14 and 16 (academic years 10 and 12) in 2013, but expanded to accommodate students aged 14 to 19.

The primary catchment area of the UTC was a 15-mile radius from the location of the UTC, which includes all of the Borough of Burnley and parts of Hyndburn, Pendle, Ribble Valley and Rossendale in Lancashire, and part of Calderdale in West Yorkshire.

Curriculum
UTC Lancashire specialised in engineering and construction. Pupils aged 14 to 16 followed one of three pathways of study divided by ability. A range of GCSEs were offered, as well as BTECs, NVQs and City and Guilds qualifications depending on the pathway.

Sixth form students also followed one of the three pathways, which could include A Levels, BTECs, NVQs and City and Guilds qualifications depending on the pathway.

All three of the pathways at both levels had a focus on the specialisms of engineering and construction.

Closure 
The college closed in July 2017 owing to low pupil numbers; in May 2016, there were 113 attending.

References

External links
 

Defunct schools in Lancashire
Schools in Burnley
Liverpool John Moores University
University of Central Lancashire
Educational institutions established in 2013
Educational institutions disestablished in 2017
2017 disestablishments in England
2013 establishments in England
Lancashire